Andi Naude (born January 10, 1996)  is a Canadian freestyle skier. She competed at the 2018 Winter Olympics for Canada in moguls.

Personal life
Naude was born in Regina, Saskatchewan but grew up in Penticton, British Columbia skiing at Apex Mountain Resort.

World Cup results 
All results are sourced from the International Ski Federation (FIS).

Season standings

Race Podiums
 10 podiums – (8 , 2 )

World Championships results

References

External links 

 
 
 Andi Naude at Freestyle Canada
 
 
 

1996 births
Living people
Canadian female freestyle skiers
Freestyle skiers at the 2018 Winter Olympics
Sportspeople from Penticton
Sportspeople from Regina, Saskatchewan
Olympic freestyle skiers of Canada